The American Journal of Cardiology is a biweekly peer-reviewed scientific journal in the field of cardiology and general cardiovascular disease. The editor-in-chief is William C. Roberts. It supersedes the Transactions of the American College of Cardiology which was published from 1951 to 1957 and the Bulletin of the American College of Cardiology, but it should not be confused with the Journal of the American College of Cardiology.

Abstracting and indexing 
The journal is abstracted and indexed in:

According to the Journal Citation Reports, the journal has a 2020 impact factor of 2.778, ranking it 80 out of 142 journals in the category "Cardiac & Cardiovascular Systems".

References

External links 
 

Elsevier academic journals
Cardiology journals
Publications established in 1958
Biweekly journals
English-language journals
1958 establishments in the United States